Hans-Peter Lanig (7 December 1935 – 28 January 2022) was a German alpine skier who competed for the United Team of Germany in the 1956 Winter Olympics and in the 1960 Winter Olympics.

He was born in Bad Hindelang, Bavaria, Germany. He was the younger brother of Evi Lanig and the brother-in-law of Lorenz Nieberl.

In 1956 he finished fifth in the Alpine downhill event and seventh in the giant slalom competition.

Four years later he won the silver medal in the 1960 downhill contest. In the same year he finished seventh in the slalom event and 13th in the giant slalom competition.

Lanig died on 28 January 2022, at the age of 86.

References

External links 
 
 

1935 births
2022 deaths
German male alpine skiers
Olympic alpine skiers of the United Team of Germany
Olympic silver medalists for the United Team of Germany
Olympic medalists in alpine skiing
Medalists at the 1960 Winter Olympics
Alpine skiers at the 1956 Winter Olympics
Alpine skiers at the 1960 Winter Olympics
People from Oberallgäu
Sportspeople from Swabia (Bavaria)
20th-century German people